Rachel Bitecofer (born February 23, 1977) is an American political scientist.

Early life and career 
Bitecofer graduated magna cum laude with honors from the University of Oregon where she earned a bachelor's degree in political science and earned her Ph.D. in political science and international affairs from the University of Georgia. In 2015 she became a lecturer at Christopher Newport University and assistant director of the Wason Center for Public Policy where she conducted polling. In 2019 she applied to convert her position to tenure track, which would lighten her teaching responsibilities, but was denied by the university. As a result, she resigned her position and went to work for the Niskanen Center, a centrist think tank in Washington, D.C. Bitecofer's analysis has appeared on multiple media platforms including MSNBC and The New York Times. She wrote the 2017 book  The Unprecedented 2016 Presidential Election on the election of Donald Trump and runs a podcast titled The Election Whisperer hosted by Substack. Today she runs Strike Pac, a liberal super PAC.

Election analysis and prediction
In 2017, Bitecofer released a book called The Unprecedented 2016 Presidential Election, where she argued that the election of Donald Trump was not the result of one or two causes, but rather the product of a long process that began in the 1950s. She noted several breaks from past political reporting in the media's coverage of Trump, such as the number of days where Trump received 60% or more of all candidate coverage and his few newspaper endorsements. She later criticized the media and public for characterizing Trump's 2016 performance in the blue wall states of Michigan, Pennsylvania, and Wisconsin as a "mythic legend of invincibility"; instead, she attributed the 2016 result to complacency, depressed African-American turnout, Russian interference, and dislike of Hillary Clinton.

Bitecofer was recognized for predicting the size of the "Blue Wave" in the 2018 United States midterm elections much earlier than other forecasters. She first predicted that Democrats would pick up 42 seats in the House of Representatives in September 2018, revising her forecast to 45 seats in November, just days before the election even as others were revising their estimates downwards. Democrats ultimately gained 41 seats in the House election, making her prediction one of the most accurate of that cycle. She then used the same theory to anticipate that Democrats would recapture the presidency more than a year out from the election.

Following the work of Alan Abramowitz on a concept called "negative partisanship" Bitecofer's main thesis is that modern elections are not decided merely by the swing vote, but rather, what she calls "coalitional turnout" for each party. Negative partisanship, which argues voters are increasingly motivated by dislike, hate, and fear of the other party prioritizes defeating the other side over any specific policy objective. Under this theory, shifts in voter turnout between cycles are critically important to each party's success. Along with a small swing each cycle among "pure" independents (independents that do not "lean" towards either party, another important and overlooked "swing" is what Bitecofer dubbed the "turnout swing" which comes from whether voters decide to vote at all rather than deciding who to vote for. This view has been criticized by other political analysts like David Wasserman of The Cook Political Report, with others such as Kyle Kondik of The Crystal Ball and Sam Wang offering more support.

Bitecofer argues that instead of ideology, Democratic candidates should "lean in" to being Democrats and abandon the preference of Democrats to nominate unobtrusive, "Blue Dogs" who run against their own party's brand. The fact that progressive favorites like Stacey Abrams and Beto O'Rourke often came much closer to winning their races in red states in 2018 than Blue Dog moderates who tried to ingratiate themselves with Trump has been held as validation for her theory. As has the successful campaigns of Raphael Warnock and Jon Ossoff in Georgia and Mark Kelly in Arizona.

In July 2019 Bitecofer predicted that President Trump would lose the 2020 election, with the Democratic candidate winning a base of at least 278 electoral votes, correctly anticipated a Democratic sweep of three Midwest states in the Democrat's so-called Blue Wall that Trump won narrowly in 2016  During the 2020 Democratic primaries, she attributed the increased turnout and Joe Biden's success in the primary process to the eagerness of Democrats and Democratic-leaning independents (and in particular, black voters) to remove Trump from office. Bitecofer argued the 2020 electorate would see the return of voters who, feeling assured of a Trump loss, sat out the 2016 election but were now "terrified" that Trump is seemingly unstoppable.

Post-academic career 

Following her research career, Bitecofer has launched a liberal super PAC named Strike Pac, which she describes as "a war machine for the Left." Arguing that strategy and messaging for Democrats is woefully asymmetrical to the GOP's, she asserts that going forward, Democrats must launch a "brand offensive" against Republicans.

Filmography
Real Time with Bill Maher (season 19)

References

External links 
 Judy Ford Wason Center for Public Policy, with articles by Rachel Bitecofer

Living people
American women political scientists
American political scientists
American political commentators
Christopher Newport University
University of Oregon alumni
University of Georgia alumni
21st-century American women writers
American women writers
1977 births